Jairon Leonel Zamora Narváez (born 5 February 1978 in Guayaquil) is an Ecuadorian football midfielder. He obtained a total number of seven international caps for the Ecuador national football team, making his debut in 1999.

Honors

Nation
 
 Canada Cup: 1999

References

Profile at Playerhistory.com

1978 births
Living people
Sportspeople from Guayaquil
Association football midfielders
Ecuadorian footballers
Ecuador international footballers
1999 Copa América players
C.S. Emelec footballers
C.D. El Nacional footballers
C.D. ESPOLI footballers
L.D.U. Loja footballers
Barcelona S.C. footballers
Deportivo Azogues footballers
C.S.D. Macará footballers